Colonel Julian Aaron Cook (October 7, 1916 – June 19, 1990) was an officer of the United States Army who gained fame during World War II for his crossing of the Waal river during Operation Market Garden in September 1944.

Biography
Cook was born at Mount Holly, Vermont on October 7, 1916 to an American father Nelson Pingrey Cook and an English mother, Honora (nee Gallagher).  His parents met when Nelson, a travelling salesman in the UK stopped for the night in a hotel in West Auckland County Durham and having enjoyed his evening meal asked to complement the cook, Honora Gallagher. He attended the United States Military Academy at West Point, and was commissioned as a second lieutenant on graduation in 1940. He volunteered for the airborne forces in 1942, joining the 504th Parachute Infantry Regiment (504th PIR), which became part of the 82nd "All American" Airborne Division.

Cook made combat jumps into Sicily, Salerno, and Anzio before taking command of the 3rd Battalion of the 504th PIR just prior to Operation Market Garden. The regiment, due to heavy losses in Italy and a lack of airborne replacements, did not participate in the Allied invasion of Normandy.

On September 17, 1944, Cook, now a major, jumped into the Netherlands near the Maas-Waal Canal. After assisting in securing the canal crossing, his unit marched to Nijmegen. 

Brigadier General James M. Gavin, commanding the 82nd Airborne, had ordered a crossing of the Waal River during daylight hours so the Americans could outflank the German defenders, who were dug in around the city's crucial bridges. Put in charge of the crossing, Cook was in the first wave across the river. As Cook's first wave began their crossing, the Allied bombardment began. The wind blew away the smokescreen, leaving the men in the water visible to the German guns. As a devout Catholic, Cook loudly recited Hail Mary during the crossing, spurring his men on under the withering fire. He took charge of the boats, redirecting those who had become disoriented and pushing the men along. Once ashore, the 504th PIR cleared the river bank, moved north and assaulted the railway bridge over the highway leading to the main road bridge in the village of Lent. Cook was subsequently awarded the Distinguished Service Cross.

After Market Garden, Cook was promoted to lieutenant colonel. Cook led his battalion during the Ardennes Offensive in fighting around Trois-Ponts, Cheneux and Herresbach, and later on in the drive through Germany. At the end of the war, he was promoted to colonel.

In 1953 Cook became American liaison officer to the French forces in French Indochina. There he became ill and spent eight months in hospitals.

He died at Columbia, SC on June 19, 1990.

Robert Redford portrayed Cook in the 1977 film A Bridge Too Far.

Honors and awards
On October 8, 1945, by Royal Decree, Cook was knighted by Queen Wilhelmina, with the rank of Knight 4th class of the Military William Order. The Order is the highest and oldest honour of the Kingdom of the Netherlands, which is bestowed for "performing excellent acts of Bravery, Leadership and Loyalty in battle". It is comparable to the French Légion d'honneur or the American Medal of Honor, but far less frequently awarded.

On September 19, 2022, a plaque was unveiled in Cook's honor on an apartment complex named after him in Nijmegen, the Netherlands.

References

1916 births
1990 deaths
People from Mount Holly, Vermont
Military personnel from Vermont
United States Army personnel of World War II
United States Army colonels
United States Military Academy alumni
United States Army Command and General Staff College alumni
Recipients of the Distinguished Service Cross (United States)
Recipients of the Legion of Merit
Knights Fourth Class of the Military Order of William
United States Army Infantry Branch personnel